Agnes Earl Lyall (1908-2013) was an American artist. She helped found the American Abstract Artists in 1936. Her work is included in the collections of the Whitney Museum of American Art, the Metropolitan Museum of Art, the Smithsonian American Art Museum, the Brooklyn Museum, the Yale University Art Gallery, the Carnegie Museum of Art, the National Gallery of Art and the Museum of Modern Art, New York.

References

1908 births
2013 deaths
20th-century American women artists
20th-century American artists
21st-century American women artists
21st-century American artists